is a Shinto shrine in Kudoyama, Ito district, Wakayama Prefecture, Japan.

In 2004, it was designated as part of a UNESCO World Heritage Site under the name Sacred Sites and Pilgrimage Routes in the Kii Mountain Range.

External links

Official Page (Japanese)

World Heritage Sites in Japan
Shinto shrines in Wakayama Prefecture
Important Cultural Properties of Japan
Kūkai